The Martin P7M was an unbuilt aircraft designed by the Glenn L. Martin Company in the 1950s. The design was initiated to meet a requirement of the United States Navy (USN) for an anti-submarine warfare flying boat.

Design and development
The design was for a flying boat that would make use of boundary layer control (BLC) to achieve slow speed flight. It was intended that this would enable the aircraft to land on the open ocean in rough seas and deploy a dipping sonar. Martin proposed a variant of the P5M Marlin, the P5M-3, to take advantage of this phenomenon. 

Martin continued development of the P5M-3 under the designation P7M Submaster, introducing two General Electric J85 BLC gas generators, one in the rear of each outer engine nacelle. A mock-up was built, but the P7M, Convair XP6Y and Grumman G-132 were all cancelled when the US Navy abandoned their open-ocean seaplane requirement.

Specifications (P7M projected)

References

P7M
Aircraft with auxiliary jet engines
Cancelled military aircraft projects of the United States
Flying boats
Parasol-wing aircraft